Mongolia participated in the 2014 Asian Beach Games in Phuket, Thailand from 14 to 23 November 2014.

Medal summary

Medal by sport

Medalists

Basketball

Ju-jitsu

Muay

Sambo

External links 
Official Site

References 

Nations at the 2014 Asian Beach Games
2014
Asian Beach Games